Muromaki Dam is an arch dam located in Toyama prefecture in Japan. The dam is used for flood control and power production. The catchment area of the dam is 128.3 km2. The dam impounds about 71  ha of land when full and can store 17000 thousand cubic meters of water. The construction of the dam was started on 1956 and completed in 1961.

References

Dams in Toyama Prefecture
1961 establishments in Japan